Skaldic Poetry of the Scandinavian Middle Ages is a project which is editing the corpus of Old Norse-Icelandic skaldic poetry., along with all poetry written down in runes. The project will publish nine volumes and is supported by a website. The corpus comprises 5797 verses by 447 skalds preserved in 718 manuscripts. As of October 2021, five volumes have been published, all of which can be accessed via the project's website. 

Anatoly Liberman wrote in a review of volume 7:  "As far as the textual criticism and decipherment of skaldic poetry are concerned, after this edition not much is left for anyone to add".

List of volumes 

 
 
 
  Forthcoming
  Forthcoming
  Forthcoming
 
 
  Forthcoming

References 

Old Norse literature
Skaldic poetry
Skaldic poems